Walton is a civil parish in the Carlisle district of Cumbria, England.  It contains nine listed buildings that are recorded in the National Heritage List for England.  Of these, one is listed at Grade II*, the middle of the three grades, and the others are at Grade II, the lowest grade.  The parish contains the village of Walton, and is otherwise rural.  The listed buildings comprise houses and associated structures, and a church with a hearse house in the churchyard.


Key

Buildings

References

Citations

Sources

Lists of listed buildings in Cumbria